Valkse is a village in Lääne-Harju Parish, Harju County in northwestern Estonia. As of 2011 Census, the settlement's population was 138.

References

Villages in Harju County